The African Central Bank (ACB) is one of the original five financial institutions and specialized agencies of the African Union. Over time, it will take over responsibilities of the African Monetary Fund. Its proposed headquarter is in Abuja (Nigeria).

When it is fully implemented, the ACB will be the sole issuer of the African single currency (the "afro" or "afriq"), it will become the banker of the African Government, it will be the banker to Africa's private and public banking institutions, it will regulate and supervise the African banking industry, and it will set the official interest and exchange rates; all in conjunction with the African Government's administration.

See also 

 Abuja Treaty
 European Central Bank
 Economic Community of West African States (ECOWAS)
 Euro
 African Monetary Union
 Central African CFA franc
 The Common Monetary Area
 Eco (currency)
 Monetary union

References

External links

https://web.archive.org/web/20070828225900/http://commentisfree.guardian.co.uk/calestous_juma/2007/07/right_vision_wrong_strategy.html

https://web.archive.org/web/20120609070731/http://www.edpsg.org/Documents/Dp14.doc

Banks of the African Union
Central banks